Georgina Lightning is a First Nations film director, screenwriter, and actress.

Biography
Born in Edmonton, Alberta, she is an enrolled member of the Samson Cree Nation. She was raised off-reserve, near the Samson community in Edmonton, Alberta.

In 2007, she was featured in Filmmaker Magazine as one of 25 New Faces of Independent Film. In 2010 she was the recipient of the "White House Project- Epic-Award for Emerging Artist". She co-founded Tribal Alliance Productions, partnering with executive producer Audrey Martinez, as a means to create opportunities for Native American, First Nations, and other Indigenous filmmakers.

In 2008, Lightning directed, wrote, and starred in the supernatural thriller film Older Than America, becoming the first North American Indigenous Woman to direct a major feature film.  The film won several major awards at film festivals. She based the film on her father's experience with the Canadian Indian residential school system and other personal family stories.

Lightning is an outspoken advocate for First Nations and Native American causes, working towards a greater appreciation and awareness of the intrinsic value of North American Indigenous cultures to not only Indigenous people themselves, but to society in general.  Her three children are either currently or previously working actors.  They are Crystle Lightning, Cody Lightning, and William Lightning.

At the 9th Canadian Screen Awards in 2021, she received a nomination for Best Supporting Actress in a Drama Series for her performance in Trickster.

Filmography
 Happily Ever After: Fairy Tales for Every Child (1995 as Morning Dove)
 Yellow Wooden Ring (1998 as Sissy Blea)
 Pocahontas II: Journey to a New World (1998 as an "additional voice")
 My Brother (1999 as Mother)
 Walker, Texas Ranger (TV, 1998-1999, two episodes, in Way of the Warrior as Sundance, and War Cry as Ellen Crow Feather)
 Backroads (2000 as Mary Lou)
 Johnny Greyeyes (2000 as Georgina)
 Christmas in the Clouds (2001 as Louise)
 Cowboy Up (2001 as Brenda)
 The West Wing (TV, 2001, as Maggie Morningstar Charles in the episode The Indians in the Lobby)
 Auf Wiedersehen, Pet (TV, 2002, as Lainie Proudfoot in four episodes: An Inspector Calls, Another Country, A Bridge too Far, and Bridge Over Troubled Water)
 Dreamkeeper (TV, 2003 as Crystal Heart, also as associate producer)
 Sawtooth (2004 as Lucy, also as executive producer and producer)
 Hanbleceya (2005 as co-producer)
 Ghosts of the Heartland (2007 as Tani)
 Older Than America (2008 as director, writer, and as lead actress portraying the character Rain)
 Blackstone (TV series, 2011, as Tracy Bull in the first season)
 Trickster (TV series, 2020)
 Pipe Nation (Canadian TV series, 2021)

References

External links
 Georgina Lightning - Official Website
 

First Nations dramatists and playwrights
Canadian women dramatists and playwrights
Cree people
Living people
First Nations filmmakers
Canadian women film directors
Year of birth missing (living people)
21st-century Canadian dramatists and playwrights
21st-century Canadian women writers
Film directors from Edmonton
First Nations women writers
Writers from Edmonton
21st-century First Nations writers